The New South Wales Rugby League is administering several competitions during the 2022 rugby league season in Australia.

Knock-On Effect New South Wales Cup 

The 2022 season of the Knock-On Effect New South Wales Cup commenced on the weekend of 12-13 March, 2022. Teams played 24 regular competition rounds, with the top five teams qualifying for the final series in September.  

Penrith Panthers won the 2022 NSW Cup grand final, defeating Canterbury-Bankstown Bulldogs 29–22 at CommBank Stadium to take their fourth premiership in this competition.

Teams 
There are 12 teams competing in the 2022 NSW Cup.

Ladder 
The New South Rugby League website maintains a competition ladder and Fixures List (draw) for the New South Wales Cup.  The website, League Unlimited, also maintain a Ladder for the NSW Cup.

Finals series

Grand final

President's Cup 

The winners of the four conferences are scheduled to meet in a two-week knock-out tournament in September 2022.

Results

Harvey Norman NSW Women's Premiership 
The 2022 season of the Harvey Norman NSWRL Women's Premiership commenced on 23 April 2022. The competition is scheduled to run for nine rounds, with Round 9 to be played on the weekend of 2-4 July 2022, and a four-team, two-week finals series to follow in July. There were nine clubs in competition.

Source: The website, League Unlimited, maintained a Women's Premiership ladder. 
The New South Wales Rugby League website hosts the Harvey Norman NSW Women's Premiership draw.

Final Series 

Semi-finals

Grand final

Jersey Flegg 
The 2022 season of the Jersey Flegg Cup for Under 21 males commenced on the weekend of 12-13 March, 2022. Twenty-four regular competition rounds ran up to 27-28 August, followed by a final series. The grand final is scheduled for Sunday, 25 September 2022.

The website, League Unlimited, maintained a Jersey Flegg ladder. 
The New South Wales Rugby League website hosts the Jersey Flegg Cup draw.

Final Series

Sydney Shield 
The 2022 season of the Sydney Shield commenced on 19 April 2022. The competition ran for 19 rounds, with Round 19 played on 6 August. A final series followed. The grand final was held on Sunday, 4 September 2022. There were seven teams in competition.

  Hills District Bulls
  Moorebank Rams 
  Penrith Brothers 
  Ryde-Eastwood Hawks 
  St Marys Saints 
  Sydney Roosters
  Wentworthville Magpies 

The website, League Unlimited, maintained a Sydney Shield ladder. 
The website, Play Rugby League hosted the Sydney Shield draw.

Final Series 

Grand final

NSW Men's Country Championships 
The 2022 Men's Country Championship was won by the Illawarra South Coast Dragons. The Dragons were coached by Wade Forrester and captained by Nathan Ford.  There were ten teams in competition, with the draw split into two groups of five with a cross-over match played in each of the two rounds. The competition ran from 26 February to 3 April 2022. 
Ladder 

Source: Play Rugby League - Men's Country Championship 
Final Series 

Grand final

NSW Women's Country Championships 
The 2022 Women's Country Championship was won by the Central Coast Roosters. The Roosters were captained by Jaz Wolfe.  There were ten teams in competition, with the draw split into two groups of five with a cross-over match played in each of the two rounds. The competition ran from 26 February to 3 April 2022. 
Ladder 

Source: Play Rugby League - Women's Country Championship 

Finals series 

Grand final

SG Ball Cup 
The 2022 season S. G. Ball Cup for Under 19 males was won by the Penrith Panthers. The Panthers were coached by Scott Thompson and were captained by Mason Teague. Joshua Wong from the Sydney Roosters was named Player of the Series.  There were fifteen teams in competition, which was played over nine rounds. The draw was arranged so that each team received a bye. A full round of matches (Round 5) was washed out, with the seven games scheduled designated as a nil-all draw. A Round 6 match between Balmain Tigers and Sydney Roosters was deemed a draw after an electrical storm curtailed play early in the second half, when the score was 6-12. The competition ran from 5 February to 30 April 2022. 

Ladder  

Source: NSWRL Website - SG Ball ladder 

Final Series

Grand final

Harold Matthews Cup 
The 2022 season Harold Matthews Cup for Under 17 males was won by the Western Suburbs Magpies. The Magpies were coached by Robbie Mears and were captained by Kit Laulilii.  There were fifteen teams in competition, which was played over nine rounds. The draw was arranged so that each team received a bye. A full round of matches (Round 5) was washed out, with the seven games scheduled designated as a nil-all draw. The competition ran from 5 February to 30 April 2022. 

Ladder  

Source: NSWRL Website - Harold Matthews Cup ladder 

Final Series 

Grand final

Tarsha Gale Cup 
The 2022 season Tarsha Gale Cup for Under 19 females was won by the Indigenous Academy Sydney Roosters. The Roosters were coached by Blake Cavallaro and captained by Tayla Montgomery. Otesa Pule from the Roosters was named Player of the Series.  There were twelve teams in competition, which was played over nine rounds. The draw was arranged so that each team received a bye. A full round of matches (Round 5) was washed out, with the five games scheduled designated as a nil-all draw. Two other matches were postponed due to wet weather and subsequently deemed a nil-all draw when they could not be rescheduled. The competition ran from 5 February to 30 April 2022. 

Ladder  

Source: NSWRL website - Tarsha Gale Cup ladder 
Final Series

Grand final

Laurie Daley Cup 
The 2022 season Laurie Daley Cup was won by the Illawarra South Coast Dragons.The Dragons were coached by Peter Hooper and were captained by Taj Ford. Dragons hooker Kyan Hjaltason was named Player of the Match. 
There were ten teams in competition, with the draw split into two groups of five with a cross-over match played in each of the five rounds. The competition ran from 5 February to 3 April 2022.
Ladder

Source: NSWRL website - Laurie Daley Cup ladder 
Finals series 

Grand final

Andrew Johns Cup 
The 2022 season Andrew Johns Cup was won by the Northern Rivers Titans.The Titans were coached by Shaun Davison and were captained by Zane Harrison. 
There were ten teams in competition, with the draw split into two groups of five with a cross-over match played in each of the five rounds. The competition ran from 5 February to 3 April 2022.
Ladder

Source: NSWRL website - Andrew Johns Cup ladder 
Finals series 

Grand final

City v Country 
The NSWRL has organised a series of City versus Country matches for the weekend of 14-15 May, 2022. Playing squads were announced on 4 May 2022.NSWRL

City versus Country Women

Open Women's City Team 
The City squad for the 2022 Open Women's match against Country. The team is coached by Darrin Borthwick.

Open Women's Country Team 
The Country squad for the 2022 Open Women's match against City. The team is coached by Ruan Sims.

Notes:
 In the above tables J# = Jersey number, Dbt = Debut Year, S = Seasons, M = Matches, T = Tries, G = Goals
 Tallies in the tables include the 2022 match.
 In relation to the extended squad of the NSW Women's State of Origin team that was named in mid-April:
  City Origin players Shaylee Bent, Jaime Chapman, Filomina Hanisi, Talei Holmes and Renee Targett were named.
  Country Origin players Teagan Berry, Olivia Kernick and Bobbi Law were named.
  City Origin eligible players Corban  Baxter, Quincy Dodd, Tiana Penitani, Jessica Sergis, Simaima Taufa, Sarah Togatuki, and Holli Wheeler are to be rested.
  Country Origin eligible players Kezie Apps, Millie Boyle, Keeley Davis, Taliah Fuimaono, Isabelle Kelly, Yasmin Meakes, Rachael Pearson, Hannah Southwell, Emma Tonegato are to be rested.
 Taina Naividi was selected as a concussion substitute in the 2021 City-Country match. 
 Olivia Kernick played for the  Indigenous All Stars team in 2021 and for the  Māori All Stars team in 2022.

City versus Country Men

Men's Open Age City Team 
The City squad for the 2022 Open Age Men's match against Country. The team is coached by Brett Cook.

Note: Eli Levido, Manaia Rudolph, Caleb Uele (all Glebe) and Semisi Kioa (Mounties) were named in the selected squad but are not named in the programme.

Men's Open Age Country Team 
The Country squad for the 2022 Open Age Men's match against City. The team is coached by Terry Campese.

Under 19 State of Origin Women 
The NSW squad for the 2022 Under 19 Women's match against Queensland. The team is coached by Blake Cavallaro.

References

2022 in Australian rugby league
Rugby league in New South Wales
Rugby league competitions in New South Wales